Ludovic Régis Arsène Blas (born 31 December 1997) is a French professional footballer who plays as a midfielder for Ligue 1 club Nantes.

Club career

EA Guingamp 
Ludovic Blas arrived at Rambouillet FC, then in district, at the age of 7. Blas already stood out from the crowd and was systematically outclassed. His trainer at the time already praised his dribbling skills and his vision of the game.

Following his father's professional transfer, he joined Montrouge FC, allowing him to travel the region and facilitate contacts with professional team scouts. Ludovic Blas was thus spotted by several clubs including AS Monaco and Guingamp. He went through all the stages of the Guingamp training during his first three years at the club before joining the professional group during the training camp of the 2015-2016 season. The coach of the reserve team, Claude Michel, particularly appreciates the technical quality of the player and his ability to make the right choices, quickly. In order to perfect his defensive folding problems, he regularly plays as a defensive midfielder with the B team, even if his profile corresponds more to a relay midfielder or a playmaker.

He made his first appearances in Ligue 1 during the 2016–17 season and signed his first professional contract in October 2015. He played his first professional match the following December 6 as a starter against the Girondins de Bordeaux and then scored his first professional goal on the 24th day of Ligue 1 on February 3, 2016, during a big win against ES Troyes four goals to nil. He played most regularly on the right wing but also made a few appearances in the center of midfield.

His second season goes without a bang and he scored his only league goal on Saturday, March 11, 2017 in a 5-0 win over Bastia, the Breton club's biggest win in Ligue 1.

He began the 2017-2018 season with a goal against Metz on the first day.

Already under contract until 2020 with Guingamp, Ludovic Blas signed for an additional season with the Armorican club on August 8, 2018.

Nantes  
 

On September 2, 2019, he signed for five years at FC Nantes. On 31 October 2019 he scored his first goals under his new colors in the national Cup, against Paris FC (8-0), a historic victory of Nantes concluded by a double of Ludovic Blas, followed by his first goal in Ligue 1, ten days later against AS Saint-Etienne (2-3). In Nantes, he took a step forward in terms of progression. In his first year in 2019–20, he inserted himself to the squad by scoring 5 goals and making an assist in 24 games played as a midfielder. He exploded in 2020–21, his second season at Nantes, where he became one of the club's key players and played all 38 games of the season, with 11 goals and 4 assists. Despite his improving, Nantes had a difficult season endend competing play-outs against Toulouse. In the 2021–22 season, after 28 games played, 9 goals scored and 3 assists, he contributes as a key piece to the success of the FC Nantes team. He also helped them win the Coupe de France and scored the winning goal, a penalty, in the final. At the start of the following season, he played in the french supercup 4–0 loss against Paris Saint-Germain, that took place at Bloomfield Stadium in Tel Aviv, Israel on 31 July 2022. On 8 September 2022 Blas made his debut in UEFA competitions, in a 2–1 win over the greek side Olympiacos. On 27 October he scored his first goal in UEFA Europa League against Qarabağ.

On 12 February 2023 Blas became the second FC Nantes' top scorer in Ligue 1 in the 21st century (30), after Emiliano Sala (42).

Style of play 
Blas is a technically gifted winger known for his close control in confined spaces and spell-binding skill in 1v1 situations. Despite standing at about 5’11, is capable of competing aerially.

During his spell at EA Guingamp under Jocelyn Gourvennec Blas was often played in midfield double pivots in order to organize the second phase of build-up and evade pressure in dangerous areas, he also played as wingback in Gourvennec’s 5-3-2. Under Antoine Kombouaré, Blas played on the wing, in a midfield two and a midfield three, and behind the striker.

Due to his qualities he has been compared to Riyad Mahrez.

Career statistics

Club

Honours
Nantes
 Coupe de France: 2021–22

France U19
 UEFA European Under-19 Championship: 2016

Individual
 UEFA European Under-19 Championship Team of the Tournament: 2016

References

External links
 
 
 

1997 births
Living people
Sportspeople from Colombes
Footballers from Hauts-de-Seine
Association football midfielders
French footballers
France youth international footballers
French people of Martiniquais descent
Ligue 1 players
Ligue 2 players
En Avant Guingamp players
FC Nantes players